The Roman Catholic Diocese of Boma is a diocese located in the city of Boma  in the Ecclesiastical province of Kinshasa in the Democratic Republic of the Congo.

History
 February 26, 1934: Established as Apostolic Vicariate of Boma from the Apostolic Prefecture of Lulua and Central Katanga and Apostolic Vicariate of Léopoldville 
 November 10, 1959: Promoted as Diocese of Boma

Bishops

Ordinaries, in reverse chronological order
 Bishops of Boma (Roman rite), below
 Bishop José-Claude Mbimbi Mbamba (2021.03.19 – ...)
 Bishop Cyprien Mbuka, C.I.C.M. (2001.03.13 – 2021.03.19)
 Bishop Joachim Mbadu Kikhela Kupika (1975.11.22 – 2001.05.21), appointed Titular Bishop of Belesasa
 Bishop Raymond Ndudi (1967.02.09 – 1975.11.22)
 Bishop André Jacques, C.I.C.M. (1959.11.10 – 1967.02.09); see below
 Vicars Apostolic of Boma (Roman rite), below
 Bishop André Jacques, C.I.C.M. (1950.12.23 – 1959.11.10); see above
 Bishop Joseph Vanderhoven, C.I.C.M. (1934.02.26 – 1949.12.04)

Coadjutor bishop
Joachim Mbadu Kikhela Kupika (1975)

Auxiliary bishops
Raymond (Nianga-Nzita) Ndudi (1962-1967), appointed Bishop here
Cyprien Mbuka, C.I.C.M. (1997-2001), appointed Bishop here

Cathedral
 
Cathedral of Our Lady of the Assumption, Boma

See also
Roman Catholicism in the Democratic Republic of the Congo

Notes

Sources
 GCatholic
 Catholic Hierarchy

Boma, Democratic Republic of the Congo
Roman Catholic dioceses in the Democratic Republic of the Congo
Christian organizations established in 1934
Roman Catholic dioceses and prelatures established in the 20th century
1934 establishments in the Belgian Congo
Roman Catholic Ecclesiastical Province of Kinshasa